Colton Flow is a lake located on the Raquette River at Colton, New York. Fish species present in the reservoir are smallmouth bass, northern pike, rock bass, yellow perch, black bullhead, and walleye. There is a  boat launch located on Gulf Road.

References 

Geography of New York (state)